Persatuan Sepakbola Kabupaten Pekalongan, commonly known as Persekap Kabupaten Pekalongan, is an Indonesian football club based in Pekalongan Regency, Central Java, Indonesia, and currently play in Liga 3.

History
Persekap Pekalongan was born on September 4, 1949. Like other Indonesian clubs, Persekap has the nickname Laskar Ki Ageng Cempaluk. The name was taken from the name of a great figure, namely the father of Ki Bahurekso. Persekap is Their homeground at the Widya Manggala Krida Stadium, an arena that only has a grandstand on the west side.

Honours
 Liga Nusantara Central Java
 Champions: 2014

References

External links
 

Football clubs in Indonesia
Football clubs in Central Java
Association football clubs established in 1949
1949 establishments in Indonesia